Samuel Grover Petrone (born 6 July 1989) is a former American soccer player who played as a forward.

College and amateur
After graduating from Glen Rock High School in New Jersey, Petrone began his college career at Clemson University in 2007.  However, he transferred to Seton Hall University in 2008 after he made only six appearances with Clemson.  In 2008, Petrone made 18 appearances and led the Pirates with nine goals and 21 points.  In 2009, he made 15 appearances and came away with one goal.  In 2010, Petrone made only 9 appearances for Seton Hall.

Petrone also played for the New Jersey Rangers in the USL Premier Development League.

Professional
On February 24, 2011, Petrone joined Swedish club Mjällby AIF.  He made his professional debut for the club on April 3, 2011 in a 1-0 loss to Helsingborgs IF. On 26 July 2012, he signed for Icelandic 1. deild karla club Leiknir on loan until the end of the season. He went on to play nine matches for the club, scoring his only goal for Leiknir in his penultimate appearance in the 3–2 away win against Höttur.

Petrone returned to the United States on January 30, 2014, signing with USL Pro club Rochester Rhinos.

References

External links
 Seton Hall University bio
 Eliteprospects profile

1989 births
Living people
American soccer players
American expatriate soccer players
Clemson Tigers men's soccer players
Seton Hall Pirates men's soccer players
NJ-LUSO Parma players
Mjällby AIF players
Husqvarna FF players
Rochester New York FC players
Glen Rock High School alumni
People from Glen Rock, New Jersey
Soccer players from New Jersey
Sportspeople from Bergen County, New Jersey
Expatriate footballers in Sweden
USL League Two players
Allsvenskan players
USL Championship players
Association football forwards